Justo Pastor Páez Molina (August 7, 1902, El Salto, Córdoba – April 22, 1969, Córdoba) was an Argentine politician. He served as Governor of Córdoba from October 12, 1963 to June 28, 1966.

References

1902 births
1969 deaths
People from Córdoba Province, Argentina
Governors of Córdoba Province, Argentina
Radical Civic Union politicians